The canton of Marensin Sud is an administrative division of the Landes department, southwestern France. It was created at the French canton reorganisation which came into effect in March 2015. Its seat is in Soustons.

It consists of the following communes:
 
Angresse
Azur
Magescq
Messanges
Moliets-et-Maa
Saint-Geours-de-Maremne
Saubusse
Seignosse
Soorts-Hossegor
Soustons
Tosse
Vieux-Boucau-les-Bains

References

Cantons of Landes (department)